= Venous heart =

A venous heart is a type of heart in which only blood with carbon dioxide circulates. Venous hearts receive blood from veins and pump it for oxygenation. It has an accessory chamber where both oxygenated and deoxygenated blood mix. This type of heart is generally found in fish. It is known as the original heart, and every other heart evolved from it.

== Structure ==
Venous hearts have only one side, with two chambers, an atrium (also known as auricle) and a ventricle. It matches the right side of 4-chambered hearts.

== Circulation ==
The circulation system pumped by a venous heart is close-looped. A venous heart pumps blood all over the body with only a single loop. Deoxygenated blood circulates to the atrium from the body, and afterwards the deoxygenated blood moves to the ventricle from the atrium. Next, the blood reaches the gills for purification.

Like all hearts, venous hearts are also engaged in the distribution of nutrients, oxygen, hormones and other necessities to all parts of the body, and remove metabolic waste.
